Norman Atun is a film actor from Kuala Lumpur, Malaysia.

Career
Since 2006, Atun has appeared in two films, both directed by Tsai Ming-liang.

While working as a food vendor, Atun was spotted by Tsai and later, with no prior acting experience, had a starring role as Rawang in the comedy-drama film I Don't Want to Sleep Alone (2006).  He followed that role with an appearance as Man in the Boat in the comedy-drama film Face (2009).

Filmography

Notes

External links
 

21st-century Malaysian male actors
Living people
Malaysian male film actors
People from Kuala Lumpur
Year of birth missing (living people)